The 2019 Karlsruhe Open (also known as the Liqui Moly Open Karlsruhe for sponsorship reasons) was a professional tennis tournament played on outdoor clay courts. It was the 1st edition of the tournament and part of the 2019 WTA 125K series, offering a total of $125,000 in prize money. It took place in Karlsruhe, Germany between 29 July and 4 August 2019.

Singles main draw entrants

Seeds 

 1 Rankings as of 22 July 2019.

Other entrants 
The following players received a wildcard into the singles main draw:
  Katharina Hobgarski
  Sabine Lisicki
  Jule Niemeier

The following players qualified into the singles main draw:
  Laura Ioana Paar 
  Stephanie Wagner
  Yuan Yue 
  Renata Voráčová

The following player received entry into the main draw as a lucky loser:
  Liana Cammilleri

Withdrawals
Before the tournament
  Ana Bogdan → replaced by  Elena-Gabriela Ruse
  Mona Barthel → replaced by  Ekaterine Gorgodze
  Anna-Lena Friedsam → replaced by  Liana Cammilleri
  Kristína Kučová → replaced by  Patricia Maria Țig
  Mandy Minella → replaced by  Bibiane Schoofs
  Natalia Vikhlyantseva → replaced by  Han Xinyun

Retirements
  Irina-Camelia Begu (left thigh injury)
  Tereza Martincová (right thigh injury)
  Tamara Zidanšek (left knee injury)

Doubles entrants

Seeds 

 1 Rankings as of 22 July 2019.

Other entrants 
The following pair received a wildcard into the doubles main draw:
  Sabine Lisicki  /  Bibiane Schoofs

Champions

Singles

  Patricia Maria Țig def.  Alison Van Uytvanck 3–6, 6–1, 6–2

Doubles

  Lara Arruabarrena /  Renata Voráčová def.  Han Xinyun /  Yuan Yue 6–7(2–7), 6–4, [10–4]

References

External links 
 Official website

2019 WTA 125K series
Tennis tournaments in Germany
2019 in German tennis
July 2019 sports events in Germany